Broadhurst may refer to:

 Broadhurst (name), a surname
 Broadhurst (Gaborone), a neighborhood in Gaborone, Botswana
 Broadhurst Park, a football stadium in Manchester, England
 Broadhurst, Sandgate, a heritage-listed house in Sandgate, Queensland, Australia
 Broadhurst Theatre (est. 1917), a Broadway theatre in New York City